The Perpignan 9th Canton is a French former canton of Pyrénées-Orientales department, in Languedoc-Roussillon. It was created 25 January 1982 by the decree 82–84. It had 14,815 inhabitants (2012). It was disbanded following the French canton reorganisation which came into effect in March 2015.

Composition
The Perpignan 9th Canton comprised part of the commune of Perpignan. It included the following neighbourhoods:
 Mas Donat
 Bas-Vernet
 Clodion-Torcatis
 Roudayre

References

External links 
 Map showing the limits of the cantons of Perpignan

Perpignan 9
2015 disestablishments in France
States and territories disestablished in 2015